104th Street may refer to the following stations of the New York City Subway in Manhattan and Queens:

104th Street (BMT Jamaica Line); serving the  trains
104th Street (IND Fulton Street Line); serving the  train
104th Street (IRT Ninth Avenue Line); demolished